Ab Har Shaam Niraali Hogi (Hindi: अब हर शाम निराली होगी) is a poetry book written by Krishan Kumar Sharma "Rasik" in August 2011. This is a Hindi Poetry work consisting of 47 poems based upon romance and sorrow.

Synopsis 
This poetry work depicts the colors and shadows of an emotional young heart who sees the shades of romance and sorrow. While he feels the sentiments of his love, he finds himself in the valley of heavenly pleasure. He finds everything on the cards and dreams of a beautiful life in the arms of his love. But soon the string of love gets the vibrations and it breaks down. The shock of separation tries to kill him but anyhow he survives and looks forward for a ray of hope.

In 47 poems, Rasik  tries to relate the life cycle of thousands of lovers who lose their love on the path of time.

Recognitions 
 "Ab Har Shaam Niraali Hogi" has been recognized and recommended by Govt. of India, Department of Official Language for 2012-13.
 "Ab Har Shaam Niraali Hogi" has been recognized and recommended by Govt. of India, Department of Official Language for 2011-12.

References 

 https://web.archive.org/web/20111005054451/http://www.indianwriters.org/addresses/State.wise.pdf
 
 https://web.archive.org/web/20140929031632/http://yugmarg.com/english/?page_id=594
 Atma Ram & Sons Publishers
 
 https://web.archive.org/web/20140314134526/http://epaper.jagran.com/ePaperArticle/03-mar-2014-edition-Chandigarh-page_13-52911-7236-261.html
 https://web.archive.org/web/20130727234226/http://epaper.amarujala.com/svww_zoomart.php?
 http://dainiktribuneonline.com/2014/01/%E0%A4%AA%E0%A5%8D%E0%A4%B0%E0%A5%87%E0%A4%AE-%E0%A4%95%E0%A5%87-%E0%A4%A7%E0%A5%82%E0%A4%AA-%E0%A4%9B%E0%A4%BE%E0%A4%82%E0%A4%B9%E0%A5%80-%E0%A4%B0%E0%A4%82%E0%A4%97/
Publishers, India. .
 http://epaper.bhaskar.com/city-life/266/27022014/cph/2/Artname=20140228i_004121007&ileft=449&itop=1053&zoomRatio=177&AN=20140228i_004121007
 Rasik, Krishan Kumar Sharma (2011). Ab har shaam niraali hogi, ARS 
 https://web.archive.org/web/20130731171916/http://rajbhasha.nic.in/hindibooks-2012.pdf
 https://web.archive.org/web/20130514075118/http://rajbhasha.nic.in/IIContent.aspx?t=enbooks_list
 https://web.archive.org/web/20130731165822/http://rajbhasha.nic.in/hindibooks-2011.pdf

Indian poetry collections
Hindi poetry collections